Tamaniais a genus of butterflies in the family Nymphalidae. It contains only one species, Tamania jacquelinae, which is found in the Neotropics, including Venezuela.

References

Butterflies described in 1995
Satyrini